Hugo Filipe dos Reis Moutinho (born 1 January 1982) is a Portuguese former professional footballer who played as an attacking midfielder. 

He began his career at Sporting, but never played in the first team, going on to have a nomadic career spent mostly in Romania and Cyprus.

Career
A graduate of Sporting CP's youth academy, Lisbon-born Moutinho made his senior debut with their reserves, going on to compete in three third division seasons with the side. In 2004, he signed for fellow league club F.C. Pampilhosa, receiving a five-match ban in November for assaulting the officiating squad and scoring his third and last goal of the campaign on 28 May 2005 in a 1–1 home draw against C.D. Fátima.

In summer 2007, after a spell with C.D. Mafra, Moutinho joined FC Drobeta-Turnu Severin in the Romanian Liga II. He became the first Portuguese player to score a hat-trick in the country in November the following year, against CS Mureșul Deva (3–2, away).

Moutinho remained in the nation until 2013, representing AFC Arieșul Turda, CS Turnu Severin and FC Politehnica Iași. He made his top-flight debut on 20 July 2012 at the age of 30, playing the full 90 minutes in a 2–1 Liga I home loss to FC Dinamo București, and scored his team's goal in a 1–1 draw at CS Concordia Chiajna on 6 May 2013; this spell was interspersed with one year back in his homeland with third-tier Clube Oriental de Lisboa, scoring against C.D. Mafra and C.D. Pinhalnovense.

In the summer of 2013, Moutinho moved to Cyprus and signed with Aris Limassol FC. His contract was terminated in December of that year, and he joined AEK Kouklia F.C. also in the country and its First Division.

The following season, Moutinho signed for Cypriot Second Division club Pafos FC.

Personal life
Moutinho's cousin, João, is also a footballer. A midfielder, he is a longtime Portuguese international.

Career statistics

References

External links

1982 births
Living people
Footballers from Lisbon
Portuguese footballers
Association football midfielders
Segunda Divisão players
Sporting CP B players
FC Pampilhosa players
C.D. Mafra players
Clube Oriental de Lisboa players
Liga I players
Liga II players
FC Drobeta-Turnu Severin players
ACS Sticla Arieșul Turda players
CS Turnu Severin players
FC Politehnica Iași (2010) players
Cypriot First Division players
Cypriot Second Division players
Aris Limassol FC players
AEK Kouklia F.C. players
Pafos FC players
Akritas Chlorakas players
Portuguese expatriate footballers
Expatriate footballers in Romania
Expatriate footballers in Cyprus
Portuguese expatriate sportspeople in Romania
Portuguese expatriate sportspeople in Cyprus